The Obolo people (also called Andoni or Idoni) are an ethnic group in the Niger Delta region of Nigeria. Obolo people are found in Rivers State and Akwa Ibom State. They have historical relations with the Oron people, Ohafia, Igbo Ogoloma, Ido, and Ibeno people, who are also from the Niger Delta.

The Obolo people occupy the longest stretch of the Niger Delta mangroves belt, which also houses the largest oil and gas deposits in the Gulf of Guinea.

History and origin

Historically, there is little or fragmented documentation on the origin and migration of the Obolo. The earliest data on Obolo migration is from around 12th century BC.

Obolo people (Andoni, Idoni or Indo) existed before the colonial era and commercial contacts with European traders. They interacted with the Bonny, Okrika, Kalabari, Nkoro, and Ette people of present Ikot-Abasi as well as the Okoro-utip and Mkpanak people of Ibeno. In the past, Obolo people frequently fought wars with the Kingdom of Bonny and the Ogoni people, though they generally maintain good relations with the latter. The Obolo have migrated and settled in various parts of Niger Delta and West Africa.

1904 British expedition
Prior to the British colonial era, the Obolo people were among the first to come in contact with the Europeans and traded mainly with the Portuguese. They worshipped a national deity called Yok-Obolo, who is the founder and spiritual head of the Obolo people said to have elevated to a god upon death.

Christianity was already accepted in Obolo land long before 1699. When John Barbot visited Dony Town (Andoni) in 1699, he observed that the King of Dony Town accepted Christianity and priests were regularly sent from Sao Tome and Brazil to minister to him. The king of Dony Town also spoke Portuguese. Nonetheless, the Yok-Obolo was still feared among neighbouring tribes, who spread rumours of their ferocity in battle to the British.

In 1869, King Jaja had to enter an oath of allegiance with the Yok-Obolo before he was allowed to establish his new town Opobo (1870) in Andoni territory. This was against the wish of Bishop Ajayi Crowther, who lamented that King Jaja was entering the "Heart of Darkness" when he came to Obolo in 1869 for treaty negotiatins with the Obolos.

In response to the stories about the Obolo, the British colonial authorities decided to send a punitive expedition against them in 1904. The expedition was led by Captain A.A. Whitehouse, with the aim of destroying Obolo as a political entity and reducing their influence among neighbouring tribes in the Niger Delta. On arrival, Whitehouse and his military team went straight to Alabie Town (Agwut-Obolo), burnt and destroyed the high altar of the deity of the Obolo monarchy, Yok-obolo, and the site of the House of Skulls with over 2,000 skulls of Obolo enemies killed in wars.

After destroying the House of Skulls and the Shrine of Yok-Obolo, the British split Andoni into six parts, each attached to one of the six Native Courts in the Niger Delta, hoping to destroy the Obolo politically. Some of the bronze arts and crafts collected by the British during this expedition are still on display in the British Museum.

Language
The Obolo people speak the Obolo language as their only native language. Obolo language contributes to the identity of the people of Andoni and Eastern Obolo. It is one of the 535 languages in Nigeria and belongs to the Lower Cross River language sub-branch of the Delta Cross branches of the Eastern Division of South Central Niger Congo language family.

Traditions

The Nwantam masquerade, celebrated every 1 January, is among the highlights of Obolo festivities, which they share with the Opobo, Nkoro, and Bonny. Their ancient practices include a writing system known as nsibidi. 

The annual fishing festival Ijok-Irin, celebrated ever 5 July, is unique to the people of Unyeada Kingdom,
and marks the of end annual traditional fishing season between July and August. Fishermen, especially migrant fishermen, return home from long fishing expeditions far into the Niger Delta to present their biggest catch (usually smoked dried) to the King of Unyeada kingdom (Okaan-Ama) as trophies. The highlight of the Ijok-Irin festival is the Net casting (Ogbo-njin) competition. This ancient, elaborately choreographed fishing method is peculiar to Unyeada people, and features net casting fishermen arranged in two opposite rows of 30 canoes or more. When a whistle blower signals, the paddling of the canoes from the opposite direction drives schools of fish into the middle, before the fishermen cast their nets in synchronization, ensuring a large catch. In recent years, the festival has been rebranded to increase its potential for ecotourism.

Economy
Obolo territory, which spans from the Oron territory in Akwa Ibom State to Bight of Bonny in Rivers State, has significant natural resources. A major part of Nigeria's oil and gas revenue is generated from Obolo land.

Notable people

 King Otuo Ogbalakon, 17th-century Obolo Warrior-king/Okaan-Obolo 
 Erastus Awortu, chairman, Andoni LGA 
 Ugbana Oyet, Sergeant at Arms, House of Commons of the United Kingdom 
 Anthony Nted Emmanuel, Former President, Maritime Workers' Union of Nigeria. 
 Rufus Godwins, Former Solicitor general of Rivers State and the current Head of Rivers State Civil Service
 Ikuinyi O. Ibani, Speaker, Rivers State House of Assembly.
 Tele Ikuru, former Deputy Governor of Rivers State.
 Prince Uche Secondus, Former National Chairman, People's Democratic Party (PDP).
 Ezekiel Warigbani, Former Governorship Candidate of the Advanced Peoples Democratic Alliance in the 2019 Rivers State gubernatorial election.
 Matilda Lambert, Nigerian Actress/film maker

References

Oron people
Ijaw
Indigenous peoples of Rivers State